Badessa is a town and separate Aanaa in eastern Ethiopia.

According to the local administration, the total population has reached 114 ,000 in 2022.

The 2007 national census reported a total population for this town of 18,187, of whom 9,592 were men and 8,595 were women. The majority of the inhabitants said they were Muslim, with 64.49% of the population reporting they observed this belief, while 33.08% of the population practised Ethiopian Orthodox Christianity and 2.07% of the population were Protestant.

The 1994 national census reported this town had a total population of 10,813 of whom 5,459 were males and 5,354 were females. It is the largest settlement in Oda bultum woreda.

A post office was in service in Badessa before the Second Italian-Abyssinian War, operating from 1923. Telephone service arrived no later than 1967. Mobile telephone service was introduced to Badessa May 2009.

References

Populated places in the Oromia Region